The 1974–75 NBA season was the Hawks' 26th season in the NBA and seventh season in Atlanta.

An unusually high total of eight Hawk players averaged double figures in points per game for the season, though Lou Hudson only played in eleven games.

Offseason

Draft picks

Roster

Regular season

Season standings

z – clinched division title
y – clinched division title
x – clinched playoff spot

Record vs. opponents

Game log

Awards and records
John Drew, NBA All-Rookie Team 1st Team

References

Atlanta
Atlanta Hawks seasons
Atlanta
Atlanta